James E. Casey (March 29, 1888 – June 6, 1983) was an American businessman, known for being the founder of the American Messenger Company, today known as UPS.

In 1907, 19-year-old James Casey founded the American Messenger Company in Seattle, Washington. He served as president, CEO and chairman. Claude Ryan was his partner and his messengers were his brother George and other teenagers.  His motto was "best service and lowest rates".  Deliveries were made on foot, bicycle, or motorcycle.

He died on June 6, 1983 in a hospital-nursing home in Seattle and his grave is at the mausoleum of the Holyrood Catholic Cemetery in Shoreline, Washington.

Background
Casey was born in Pick Handle Gulch near Candelaria, Nevada, the son of Irish immigrants.

He consistently gave credit to his mother, Annie E. Casey, for holding their family together after Jim's father died. As a youngster delivering packages on the Seattle streets, Jim Casey was exposed to the excesses of a bustling city in the midst of the Klondike Gold Rush. He credited the guidance of a strong mother and support of his family with keeping him grounded.

On August 28, 1907, he founded the American Messenger Company with Claude Ryan in Seattle, Washington, capitalized with $100 in debt. Most deliveries at this time were made on foot and bicycles were used for longer trips.

In 1913, the American Messenger Company agreed to merge with Evert McCabe's Motorcycle Messengers. Merchants Parcel Delivery was formed and focused now on packages.  Their first delivery car was a 1913 Ford Model T.

In 1919, the company expanded beyond Seattle and changed its name to United Parcel Service (UPS).

The successful businessman sought ways to help those who lacked the family life he found to be so crucial. With his brothers George and Harry and his sister Marguerite, Mr. Casey created Casey Family Programs in 1966 to help children who were unable to live with their birth parents—giving them stability and an opportunity to grow to responsible adulthood.

By the time of his death, Mr. Casey left three legacies: UPS, the Annie E. Casey Foundation, and Casey Family Programs.

Casey was a member of the U.S. Department of Labor Hall of Fame (since 2002) and the Logistics Hall of Fame (since 2016).

References

External links

U.S. Department of Labor - Labor Hall of Fame - James E. Casey
Jim Casey Youth

1888 births
1983 deaths
Businesspeople from Seattle
American people of Irish descent
20th-century American businesspeople
United Parcel Service